"Everybody Wants Some!!" is a song by the American hard rock band Van Halen it is the second track off their 1980 album Women and Children First. It is one of the band's most popular songs, starting as a concert highlight throughout the band's early career.

Chuck Klosterman of Vulture.com ranked it the 36th-best Van Halen song, writing that "Roth’s improvised rap is lascivious and fetishistic."

Composition
The song is rife with experimental features including a "jungle" drum and Tarzan-like vocal introduction and some new guitar playing techniques from guitarist Eddie Van Halen.  The drum-vocal interlude or breakdown section has an improvised feel, with Roth ad-libbing conversational dialogue;  for example, he begins the section by saying “I like…” before being cut off by Eddie striking a guitar chord, then finishes "I like the way the line runs up the back of the stockings". At the very end of the song, Roth quips, "Look, I'll pay you for it, what the fuck?" The last word is not clearly audible due to the song's fade-out ending, and radio stations occasionally play the uncensored song as a result.

The song was a staple on all of the tours with Roth, following its release. Often, the band would stop in the middle of the song and Roth would chat with the crowd for several minutes before finishing the song. In later years, with their later lead singers, Van Halen would use the opening drum beat from this song as an introduction into "Panama."

In popular culture

 The song appeared in the 1985 comedy Better Off Dead in a humorous Claymation scene. Other film appearances include the 2001 comedy Joe Dirt, the 2009 horror-comedy Zombieland,   and Richard Linklater's 2016 film Everybody Wants Some!! (2016).
 The 1999 Judd Apatow-produced comedy Freaks and Geeks featured the song in episode 9, "We've Got Spirit".

References

Further reading

1980 singles
1980 songs
Van Halen songs
Song recordings produced by Ted Templeman
Songs written by Michael Anthony (musician)
Songs written by Alex Van Halen
Songs written by Eddie Van Halen
Songs written by David Lee Roth
Warner Records singles